The 1942 international cricket season was abandoned because of the Second World War. There was no domestic cricket played in any country.

See also
 Cricket in World War II

References

International cricket competitions by season
1941 in cricket